Gruszynski is a surname.

People with the surname 

 Alexander Gruszynski (born 1950), Polish-American cinematographer, actor and film director
 Stan Gruszynski (born 1949), American politician
 Staush Gruszynski (born 1985), American politician

References

See also 

 Gruszynki

Surnames
Polish-language surnames